Tomas Nagys (born March 5, 1980) is a Lithuanian former professional basketball player. 
Born in Mažeikiai, Nagys is 6 ft 10 inches (2m 10 cm) height, 270 lbs (125 kg) weight.

References
 Tomas Nagys Videos
 Tomas Nagys Eurobasket Profile
 Profile at Clemson University Men's Basketball Team
 

1980 births
Living people
Clemson Tigers men's basketball players
KK Włocławek players
Lithuanian men's basketball players
People from Mažeikiai